Waterplace Park is an urban park situated along the Woonasquatucket River in downtown Providence, Rhode Island at the original site of the Great Salt Cove. Finished in 1994, Waterplace Park is connected to 3/4 mile of cobblestone-paved pedestrian walkways along the waterfront known as Riverwalk. Venice-styled Pedestrian bridges cross the river. Most of Riverwalk is below street level and automotive traffic. Waterplace Park and Riverwalk together are host to Providence's popular summertime Waterfire events, a series of bonfires lit on the river accompanied by classical and world music.

See also
 List of contemporary amphitheatres
Waterfire

References
Woodward, Wm Mckenzie.  Guide to Providence Architecture.  1st ed.  2003: United States.  p 305.

Geography of Providence, Rhode Island
Protected areas of Providence County, Rhode Island
Tourist attractions in Providence, Rhode Island